The Arizona Christian Firestorm football team is the intercollegiate football team of Arizona Christian University (ACU). The Firestorm are part of the National Association of Intercollegiate Athletics (NAIA). The Firestorm won the CSFL Championship in their first two seasons competing in the conference. As of November 12, 2016, the Firestorm have an all-time record of 15–13. The team's motto is "Roll Storm."

History

The Inaugural Season (2014)

On September 14, 2013, ACU President Len Munsil announced that the team would begin play in the NAIA the following season. A national search was started for the team's first head coach, and received over 100 applicants. On December 19, 2013 the university announced that Donnie Yantis would be ACU's first head football coach. The team played a non-conference schedule during the season and ended up going 2–7 on the season.

CSFL Champions (2015)

After starting 0–3 in non-conference, the Firestorm went on to win their next 6 games and capture the CSFL Championship. The team surprised many, especially after starting so slow in non-conference play. The team finished the season ranked #22 in the nation, just missing out on the playoffs.

The Jeff Bowen era (2016–present)

During the off-season, Head Coach Donnie Yantis took a job with Arizona State Sun Devils football. Assistant Head Coach Jeff Bowen was promoted to head coach of the program. The 2016 season showed similar results to the 2015 campaign, with the team finishing undefeated in conference play and 7–3 overall and winning their second consecutive CSFL Championship. The team again finished the season ranked #22 in the nation. Punter Derek Brush became the first NAIA All-American in the program's three year history. In November 2016, the CSFL coaches named Gerrit Groenewold the Offensive Player of Year, Johnathon Parks as Newcomer of the Year, Derek Brush as Special Teams Player of the Year and Jeff Bowen as Head Coach of the Year.

Head coaches

In their history, the ACU Firestorm have had 2 head coaches.

Seasons

References

 
American football teams established in 2014
2014 establishments in Arizona